Ravens Wood School, formerly Bromley Technical High School, located in Keston, London Borough of Bromley, England, is an all-boys school. The sixth form accepts both boys and girls. In 2018  the school had 1,537 pupils. The school is a designated technology college, specialising in Design Technology and Information Technology. The school became an academy on 1 April 2011.

Ravens Wood School (RWS) is part of the Impact Multi Academy Trust.

Sport 
In May 2007, the Year 10 football squad won the English Schools' Football Association Under 15 Schools' Cup. In April 2012, the Under 18 Rugby Academy reached the Daily Mail Vase Final played at Twickenham. Ravens Wood lost narrowly against the Leys School. In April 2014 the Year 8 team won the English Schools Football Association Under 13 Schools Cup on penalties at Reading's Madejski Stadium.

The RWS Football and Rugby academies are developed exclusively for students entering Sixth Form. As of 2015, there are around 30 students for the Rugby Academy and three teams for the Football Academy. The Football Academy is tied with Fulham FC which allows the students to closely participate with the club including use of their training facilities, coaches and pathways to semi-professional clubs.

In July 2021, four boys completed the Ben Morgan Memorial Run in fancy dress - two in inflatable dinosaur suits, one as a minion and one as a banana.

Drama
The school has achieved success in the Rock Challenge dance/drama competition having won the Southern Premier league three years in a row which is the first time ever to happen in Rock Challenge (2008, 2009 and 2010) and also came second in the first ever Rock Challenge National Final (2009). It is thought to be the first boys' school in the UK to take the contemporary dance drama title.

Performing Arts Academy (RAPA) 
The Ravens Wood Academy of Performing Arts (RAPA) was established in September 2009 to house and extend the most elite performing students. Theses students receive professional training during senior years. They receive 4 additional training sessions as part of their sixth form studies.

Music Academy 
The Ravens Wood Music Academy was established in September 2011.

Admission to the Music Academy is by audition only and ABRSM Grade 5 or equivalent in an instrument.

Notable alumni 

Olugbenga Adelekan
David Bowie
Hardy Caprio
Peter Frampton
Jason Hawes
Hanif Kureishi
Keith Ludeman
Ian Parker
John Pienaar
Steven Severin
Starsmith
George Underwood

References

External links
Ravens Wood School Official Website

Academies in the London Borough of Bromley
Boys' schools in London
Secondary schools in the London Borough of Bromley